Gulaebaghavali is a 2018 Indian Tamil-language heist action comedy film written and directed by Kalyaan and produced by KJR Studios. The film stars Prabhu Deva and Hansika Motwani, with Revathi, Ramdoss, Anandaraj, and Yogi Babu in supporting roles. Featuring music by Vivek–Mervin and cinematography by R. S. Anandakumar, the film was released on 12 January 2018.

Plot 

The story opens in the British India reign, where a British gentleman and his porter are trying to catch a ferry. On the way, however, one of the suitcases being carried by the porter falls and opens, revealing many diamonds. The porter steals some of the diamonds and sends the gentleman on his way. He hides these diamonds in a trunk, which he buries near a temple in the Gulaebaghavali village.

The story then shifts to 2018, where Maasha (Revathi) fools Mayilvaganam (Sathyan), thinking that her son is dead. Then, she steals his car. Meanwhile, Badri (Prabhu Deva) and his boss Nambi (Mansoor Ali Khan) perform petty thefts for a living. While at a pub, Badri spots Viji (Hansika Motwani) and falls for her. Soon, due to a misunderstanding, Badri unknowingly accepts to steal a priceless statue from the temple at Gulaebagavali and runs into Viji. The duo escapes from the villagers' hands and falls into the hands of a businessman named Sampath (Madhusudhan Rao) and his brother-in-law (Anandaraj), who is also Munish's (Ramdoss) boss. Nambi and Munish's boss forcefully send Badri and Viji to Gulaebaghavali to steal the trunk (it is revealed that the businessman is the porter's grandson). With some help from Munish and Maasha, they steal the trunk. Munish opens it, and a skeleton is revealed. After a lot of confusion, the trunk is delivered, where it is revealed that the diamonds are stored in the skeleton. After a long argument, the police comes to the spot and finds that the diamonds were very valuable. After they escape from the police, it is revealed that during the fight, a hand of the skeleton fell in Maasha's car. On finding this out and how Maasha tried to deceive the other three, the trio chases her. A parallel storyline involves Mayilvaganam and a don named Annachi (Rajendran), which ultimately culminates in the climax.

Cast

Production
In April 2017, Prabhu Deva agreed terms to work on a fantasy adventure comedy film titled Gulaebaghavali under the direction of Kalyaan, who had previously made Katha Solla Porom (2016) and Kaathadi (2018). Hansika Motwani, who had earlier worked in Prabhu Deva's productions and directorial projects, was cast to play the leading female role opposite Prabhu Deva. Produced by KJR Studios, the makers also cast Revathi in a pivotal role, while a bevy of supporting actors including Ramdoss, Yogi Babu and Anandaraj were also recruited. A first look poster was released in May 2017, with Deva and Hansika revealed to be portraying con-artistes. Following the release of Baahubali: The Conclusion (2017), the team actively decided to enhance the film's budget on costumes to ensure a rich production value appeared on screen. The makers of the film included a scene which makes a reference to the 1955 film of the same name, with Kalyaan devising a special flashback sequence to connect the two films. For a particular set in the film, the art director created a replica of the Hanging Gardens of Babylon at a cost of two crores.

Release
Tamil Nadu theatrical rights of the film were sold for 5 crore. The satellite rights of the film were sold to Sun TV.

Soundtrack

The film's music was composed by duo Vivek–Mervin, in their fourth film venture following Vadacurry (2014), Pugazh (2016) and Dora (2017). The soundtrack was released on 24 December 2017 through Think Music India.

Awards and nominations

References

External links 
 

2018 films
2010s Tamil-language films
Films shot in Chennai
2018 masala films
2018 action comedy films
Indian action comedy films